is a Japanese footballer currently playing as a defender for Albirex Niigata (S).

Career statistics

Club
.

Notes

References

2003 births
Living people
Association football people from Tokyo
Japanese footballers
Japanese expatriate footballers
Association football defenders
Albirex Niigata Singapore FC players
Japanese expatriate sportspeople in Singapore
Expatriate footballers in Singapore